Joseph Edelston (27 April 1891 – 10 March 1970) was an English professional football player and manager, best remembered for his 17 years serving Fulham in the Football League as a player, caretaker manager and reserve team manager. He also represented Hull City and Manchester City as a player and was included in the FA XI squad for a tour of South Africa in 1910. Later in his career he managed Reading and worked for Brentford and Leyton Orient as a coach. His son Maurice was also a footballer and later a successful sports broadcaster.

References

1891 births
1970 deaths
People from Appley Bridge
English footballers
St Helens Recreation F.C. players
Hull City A.F.C. players
Manchester City F.C. players
Fulham F.C. players
English Football League players
Association football midfielders
Brentford F.C. non-playing staff
Leyton Orient F.C. non-playing staff
Reading F.C. managers
Fulham F.C. managers
English Football League managers
English football managers